Homeira Moshirzadeh (born 1962) is an Iranian political scientist and associate professor in the Department of International Relations and an associate faculty at the Center for Women's Studies, at University of Tehran.

Career
Moshirzadeh has published many books in Persian. She has translated some of the major IR texts into Persian, including Hans Morgenthau's Politics among Nations and Alexander Wendt's Social Theory of International Politics.

Her articles on international relations, feminism, Iran 's foreign policy, and dialogue of civilizations have been published in Persian and English journals, including Siasat Khareji (Foreign Policy), Majalleh Daneshkadeh Hoghoogh va Olum Siasi, and The Iranian Journal of International Affairs. Some of her articles on dialogue of civilizations, cultural studies, and women's studies have appeared in edited volumes in Persian and English. Moshirzadeh's From a Social Movement to a Social Theory: History of Feminism won the Women's Library Prize in 2005.

She is a board member of the Editorial Board at the International Journal of Political Science.

Works and Publications

As author
 Social Movements: A Theoretical Introduction, 2001
 From a Social Movement to a Social Theory: History of Feminism, 2002
 Theories of International Relations, 2005
 An Introduction to Women's Studies, 2005
 
 Civilizational Dialogue and Political Thought: Tehran Papers - Global Encounters: Studies in Comparative Political Theory(Contributing author), 2007 
 
 Friendship in International Relations and a Homegrown Perspective: Lessons from Sa’di - co-authored with Fariba Alikarami, 2018.

Articles
 Recent Theoretical Developments in IR: Implications for Indigenous Theorizing, 2011
 Revival of Foreign Policy Analysis: a multi variable analysis, 2015
 Majalleh Daneshkadeh Hoghoogh va Olum Siasi
 
 Siasat Khareji (Foreign Policy)
 
 
 The Iranian Journal of International Affairs
 Iranian Exceptionalism and Iran-US Relations: From 1979 to 2021, 2020.

As editor
 Caspian Sea: An Overview (Editor), 2002

Translations
 Social Theory of International Politics by Alexander Wendt
 Politics among Nations by  Hans Morgenthau

References

External links
 Homeira Moshirzadeh's Articles list, Research in Theoretical Articles
 Profile at the University of Tehran
 Homeira Moshirzadeh's list of Journal Articles, Noormags
 Editorial Team: Dr. Homeira Moshirzadeh, EScience Press
 List of Homeira Moshirzadeh's publications

1962 births
Living people
Iranian women scientists
Academic staff of the University of Tehran
Iranian political scientists
Iranian writers
Persian-language writers
Women political scientists